Homoeopteryx is a genus of moths in the family Saturniidae first described by Felder in 1874.

Species
Homoeopteryx divisa Jordan, 1924
Homoeopteryx elegans Jordan, 1924
Homoeopteryx major Jordan, 1924
Homoeopteryx malecena (Druce, 1886)
Homoeopteryx syssauroides Felder, 1874

References

Oxyteninae